Matak Airport is an airport located on the island of Matak in the Anambas Islands on Riau Islands Province, Indonesia. It serves charter flights from and to Jakarta–Halim for MedcoEnergi, as well as commercial flights to and from Tanjung Pinang and Batam.

Airlines and destinations

Statistics

References

Airports in the Riau Islands